Knut Faldbakken (born 31 August 1941, in Hamar) is a Norwegian novelist. 

He studied psychology at Oslo University, and then worked as a journalist. Faldbakken visited a number of countries, working variously as a bookkeeper, sailor, and factory worker, and began writing books in 1967 while living in Paris.

He was editor of the literary magazine Vinduet (The Window) between 1975 and 1979.

His sons Stefan Faldbakken and Matias Faldbakken have achieved recognition as a film director and a novelist respectively.

His books have been published in 21 countries, translated to 18 languages and have sold two million copies worldwide.

Selected bibliography

 The Sleeping Prince  (Maude danser), 1971
 Twilight Country (Uår: Aftenlandet), 1974
 Adam's Diary (Adams dagbok), 1978
 The Hunter (Glahn), 1985

References

1941 births
Norwegian male writers
Norwegian science fiction writers
People from Hamar
Hamar Katedralskole alumni
Living people